Athletics competitions at the 1991 South Pacific Games were held in Port Moresby, Papua New Guinea, between September 13–21, 1991.

A total of 41 events were contested, 23 by men and 18 by women.

Medal summary
Medal winners and their results were published on the Athletics Weekly webpage
courtesy of Tony Isaacs and Børre Lilloe, and on the Oceania Athletics Association webpage by Bob Snow.

Complete results can also be found on the Oceania Athletics Association webpage by Bob Snow.

Men

Women

Medal table (unofficial)

Participation (unofficial)
Athletes from the following 16 countries were reported to participate:

 
 
 
 
 
 
 
 
 
 
 
/ 
 
 
/

References

External links
Pacific Games Council
Oceania Athletics Association

Athletics at the Pacific Games
Athletics in Papua New Guinea
South Pacific Games
1991 in Papua New Guinean sport
1991 Pacific Games